Karel Klaver (born 29 September 1978 in Amsterdam, North Holland) is a field hockey player from the Netherlands, who won the silver medal with the national squad at the 2004 Summer Olympics in Athens.

References

External links
 

1978 births
Living people
Dutch male field hockey players
Olympic field hockey players of the Netherlands
Olympic silver medalists for the Netherlands
Field hockey players at the 2004 Summer Olympics
Field hockey players from Amsterdam
Olympic medalists in field hockey
Medalists at the 2004 Summer Olympics
HC Bloemendaal players
2002 Men's Hockey World Cup players
2006 Men's Hockey World Cup players
20th-century Dutch people
21st-century Dutch people